"Never Let Me Go" is a song by Australian blues and rock band The Black Sorrows. It was released in January 1991 as the third single from their sixth studio album Harley and Rose. It peaked at 30 on the ARIA Charts in April 1991.

At the ARIA Music Awards of 1992, the song earned the Black Sorrows a nomination for ARIA Award for Best Group, losing to "Live Baby Live" by INXS.

Track listing
Australian 7" single (656572 7)
 "Never Let Me Go" – 4:04
 "Never Let Me Go"  (Swamp Mix)  – 4:17

UK/Australian CD/12" single (656572 2)
 "Never Let Me Go" – 4:04
 "A Place in the World" – 4:33
 "Brown Eyed Girl" – 3:32
 "Never Let Me Go"  (Swamp Mix)  – 4:17

Weekly charts

Cover versions
 In 2006, Vika and Linda Bull recorded an acoustic version for their album Between Two Shores.

References

1990 songs
1991 singles
The Black Sorrows songs
Songs written by Joe Camilleri
Song recordings produced by Joe Camilleri